Owain Danwyn (fl. 440) was a king of Rhos in Gwynedd, northwestern Wales, in the mid-5th century. He was the son of Einion Yrth and the father of Cynlas Goch, probably the Cuneglasus excoriated by Gildas. Very little is known of his life. Graham Phillips and Martin Keatman proposed a theory that he was the historical figure behind the legend of King Arthur.

History
Owain Danwyn (Old Welsh Dantguin, also spelled Ddanwyn, Ddantgwyn, etc., meaning "White Tooth"), is known from several medieval genealogies of the kings of Rhos. Most of these concur that he was the son of Einion Yrth and grandson of Cunedda, founder of the Gwynedd dynasty in North Wales. His brother was Cadwallon Lawhir ap Einion, known from the Gwynedd pedigrees. Owain was the father of Cynlas Goch, who is identified with the prince named Cuneglasus who Gildas castigated for his various sins in De Excidio et Conquestu Britanniae. According to the Bonedd y Saint, a genealogy of British saints, Owain was also the father of the saints Einion Frenin, Seiriol and Meirion, and in some versions, Hawystl Gloff.

According to Gildas, Maelgwn, the son of Owain's brother Cadwallon, took the throne of Gwynedd by murdering an uncle. Peter Bartrum suggests this may have been Owain, though he notes that Gildas' term avunculus typically refers to a maternal uncle.

Arthurian identification
Writers Graham Phillips and Martin Keatman proposed that Owain Danwyn was the historical basis for the legendary King Arthur. This theory is based partly on their interpretation of the British power structure in the 5th century, and interpretations of names and epithets associated with Owain's family. According to Phillips and Keatman, "Arthur" was Owain's honorific title, meaning "Bear", and his capital was Viroconium in Shropshire, England.

Charles T. Wood commented that their thesis lacked conclusive proof but noted that their book was "always accurate in its use of sources and seldom wildly farfetched in the conclusions it draws." Rodney Castleden criticized the assumptions Phillips and Keatman based their conclusions on.

See also
Kings of Wales family trees

References

5th-century Welsh monarchs
Historical figures as candidates of King Arthur
Monarchs of Rhos